Jean-Luc Bennahmias (born 2 December 1954) is a French politician.

Political career

Bennahmias was National secretary of the Green Party (1997–2001), Regional councillor (1992–1996) and Chairman of the Green Group on the Provence-Alpes-Côte d'Azur Regional Council (2004-2010), Member of the European Parliament (2004-2014). 
He joined in 2007 the Democratic Movement, and sat on the European Parliament's Committee on Employment and Social Affairs and was also a substitute for the Committee on Culture and Education, a substitute for the Committee on Petitions, a member of the delegation for relations with South Africa, and a substitute for the delegation for relations with Canada.

Bennahmias was the candidate of the Democratic Movement for the municipal elections in Marseille in March 2008. He left the centrist party to create his own centre-left party in 2014.

Professional career
 Advanced Technician's Certificate (1976)
 University diploma in training (1984)
 Journalist (1974–1994)

Personal life
He is of Sephardi Jew descent.

References

External links

 European Parliament biography
 Declaration of financial interests (in French; PDF file)
 Marseille Democrate - Unofficial website of the Democratic Movement in Marseille(in French)

1954 births
Living people
Politicians from Paris
MEPs for South-East France 2004–2009
MEPs for South-East France 2009–2014
Democratic Movement (France) politicians
Democratic Movement (France) MEPs
The Greens (France) MEPs
20th-century French Sephardi Jews